John Simon (born October 14, 1990) is an American football outside linebacker who is a free agent. He played college football at Ohio State, and was drafted by the Baltimore Ravens in the fourth round of the 2013 NFL Draft. He has also played for the Houston Texans, Indianapolis Colts, New England Patriots, Tennessee Titans, and Pittsburgh Steelers.

Early years
Simon was born in Youngstown, Ohio.  He played high school football for the Mooney Cardinals of Cardinal Mooney High School in Youngstown, Ohio.  Ranked by Rivals.com as the No. 36 defensive tackle in the class of 2009, Simon chose Ohio State over offers from Nebraska, Notre Dame and Pittsburgh. He played in the 2009 U.S. Army All-American Bowl.

College career
Simon attended Ohio State University, and played for the Ohio State Buckeyes football team from 2009 to 2012.  As a senior in 2012, he was named the Big Ten Conference Defensive Player of the Year, and received first-team All-Big Ten honors.  He was also named a third-team All-American selection by the Associated Press.  He finished his career with 154 tackles and 20.5 quarterback sacks.

Professional career

Baltimore Ravens 
Simon was drafted by the Baltimore Ravens in the fourth round, with the 129th overall pick, of the 2013 NFL Draft. He signed a four-year, $2.545 million contract on May 21, 2013. On August 30, 2014, Simon was waived by the Ravens and was signed to the practice squad the next day.

Houston Texans 
On October 7, 2014, Simon was signed by the Houston Texans off the Ravens' practice squad. On October 9, 2014, Simon recorded his first NFL sack against the Indianapolis Colts. On March 16, 2016, Simon signed a restricted free agent tender with the Texans.

In Simon's third season, he recorded 53 tackles, 1 fumble recovery and 5 sacks.

Indianapolis Colts 
On March 10, 2017, the Indianapolis Colts signed Simon to a three-year, $13.5 million contract. He started nine games for the Colts in 2017 before being placed on injured reserve on December 5, 2017 with a shoulder injury.

On September 1, 2018, Simon was released by the Colts.

New England Patriots
On September 26, 2018, Simon was signed by the New England Patriots. Simon finished the 2018 season with 17 tackles (8 solo) and 2 sacks. Simon helped the Patriots win Super Bowl LIII where they beat the Los Angeles Rams 13-3.

On March 13, 2019, Simon signed a two-year contract extension with the Patriots.
In week 2 against the Miami Dolphins, Simon recorded his first sack of the season in the 43-0 win.
In week 6 against the New York Giants, Simon recorded an interception off a pass from Daniel Jones that was tipped by teammate Stephon Gilmore in the 35-14 win.
In week 7 against the New York Jets, Simon recorded a strip sack on Sam Darnold which was recovered by teammate Kyle Van Noy in the 33-0 win.

Tennessee Titans
On July 25, 2021, Simon signed with the Tennessee Titans. He was released on August 29, 2021. He was re-signed to the practice squad on October 5. He was promoted to the active roster on October 9. He was released on November 6. He re-signed with the Titans on November 23. He was waived on December 6.

Pittsburgh Steelers
On December 13, 2021, Simon signed with the Pittsburgh Steelers practice squad. He signed a reserve/future contract with the Steelers on January 27, 2022. He was released on May 16, 2022.

References

External links
Ohio State Buckeyes bio
Baltimore Ravens bio
Houston Texans bio
Indianapolis Colts bio

1990 births
Living people
Players of American football from Youngstown, Ohio
American football defensive ends
American football defensive tackles
Ohio State Buckeyes football players
Baltimore Ravens players
Houston Texans players
Indianapolis Colts players
New England Patriots players
Tennessee Titans players
Pittsburgh Steelers players